A paroxysmal depolarizing shift (PDS) or depolarizing shift is a hallmark of cellular manifestation of epilepsy. Little is known about the initiation, propagation and termination of PDS. Previously, electrophysiological studies have provided the evidence  that there is a Ca2+ mediated depolarization, which causes voltage gated Na+ channels to open, resulting in action potentials.  This depolarization is followed by a period of hyperpolarization mediated by Ca2+-dependent K+ channels or GABA-activated Cl− influx.. In general, synaptic PDS could be initiated by EPSPs, and the plateau potential of the PDS is maintained by a combination of synaptic potentials (EPSPs, IPSPs) and ionic conductances (persistent sodium current and high-threshold calcium current) and the post-PDS hyperpolarization is governed by multiple potassium currents, activated by calcium or sodium entry, as well as by leak current. The next cycle of depolarization is initiated by both synaptic drive and the hyperpolarization-activated IH current.

In contrast, there lies non-synaptic mechanism of PDS. Unmasking persistent sodium current in presence of calcium channel blockers has been well studied. It is likely that calcium channel blockers will block voltage and ligand gated calcium channels, thereby affecting calcium-activated potassium channel in invertebrate model systems. The initiation of PDS without blocking any channel is much more prevalent in mammalian neurons, for example, thalamocortical neurons, CA3 pyramidal neurons, and some hypothalamic neurons. The possibility of spontaneous bursting in these neurons is implicated in regulating hormonal secretion. The significance of PDS may increase the signal-to-noise ratio, and play a vital role in information processing, synaptic plasticity. In contrast, the PDSs could be generated by electrical or chemical stimulation of single neurons.

Depending on influx of ions, PDS can be theoretically categorized into two types. Ca2+ dependent PDS requires the entry of Ca2+ while Na+ dependent PDS is presumed to be non-synaptic.

The PDS found in invertebrates such as Helix, and higher vertebrates are assumed to be predominantly generated by activation of the AMPA receptor, subsequently leading to activation of the NMDA receptor. The evidence shows that there is a probable increase in intracellular calcium ions, which sustain calcium-dependent PDS. As usual, these Ca-ions will activate calcium dependent potassium channels and PDS will terminate. This is the case that provides a clue for synaptic transmission.. The amount of calcium entry through ion channels is critical in determining the physiological or pathological state of individual neurons,). For example, high concentration of calcium perturbs Ca-signalling cascades, leading to the death of neurons and circuits, while adequate amount of calcium will help in maintaining normal physiological function.

Alternatively the PDS can still occur and is less frequently studied by blocking calcium channels with heavy metals such as Ni2+. Further evidence for Na+ dependent PDS is highlighted in leeches with the possibility of studying PDS in detail. It is likely that such type of PDS is sustained in the absence of Calcium, the case represents the non-synaptic nature of PDS. Finally, the Na/K pump and calcium activated potassium channel might play a role in terminating PDS. Paradoxically, there might arise the argument whether intracellular calcium could be able to repolarize the single neuron while blocking this calcium entry from the extracellular milieu. However, the other opportunity such as Na+-Ca2+ exchange as well as small contribution from intracellular stores need to be explored.

If several million neurons discharge at once, it shows up on a scalp EEG as a focal interictal epileptiform spike.  Paroxysmal depolarizing shifts can lead to an epileptic seizure if there is an underlying predisposition, and recording the spike can be an important aid in distinguishing seizure types.

References

Further reading

http://www.aesnet.org/index.cfm?objectid=AB567D39-E7FF-0F41-282DBE7D52DE97DF

Epilepsy